The enzyme orsellinate decarboxylase catalyzes the chemical reaction

2,4-dihydroxy-6-methylbenzoate  orcinol + CO2

This enzyme belongs to the family of lyases, specifically the carboxy-lyases, which cleave carbon-carbon bonds.  The systematic name of this enzyme class is 2,4-dihydroxy-6-methylbenzoate carboxy-lyase (orcinol-forming). This enzyme is also called orsellinate carboxy-lyase.

References

 

EC 4.1.1
Enzymes of unknown structure